Second to None may refer to:

 2nd to None, a 2003 album by Elvis Presley
 Second to None (Chemistry album), a 2003 album by Chemistry
 Second to None (film), a 1927 British silent war film
 "Second to None", a song by Styles of Beyond, featuring Mike Shinoda of Linkin Park and Fort Minor, from the albums Transformers: The Album (2007) and Reseda Beach (2012)
 Second to None, a marching song of the II Corps